Farbus Mountain is located on the provincial border of Alberta and British Columbia in Banff National Park. It was named in 1918 after Farbus, a village on the eastern slopes of Vimy Ridge in France.In the Battle of Vimy Ridge, Canadian troops retook Farbus from German control on April 9, 1917 as part of securing the Brown Line objective.

See also
List of peaks on the Alberta–British Columbia border
Mountains of British Columbia

References

Three-thousanders of Alberta
Three-thousanders of British Columbia
Mountains of Banff National Park